Ephraim W. Harrington (January 16, 1833 - October 19, 1914) was a Union Army soldier in the American Civil War who received the U.S. military's highest decoration, the Medal of Honor.

Harrington was born in Waterford, Maine on January 16, 1833, and entered service at Kirby, Vermont. He was awarded the Medal of Honor, for extraordinary heroism shown on May 3, 1863, at the Battle of Chancellorsville, while serving as a Sergeant with Company G, 2nd Vermont Infantry. His Medal of Honor was issued on December 13, 1893.

Harrington died at the age of 81, on October 19, 1914, and was buried at Grove Cemetery in St. Johnsbury, Vermont.

Medal of Honor citation

See also

Battle of Chancellorsville
Second Battle of Fredericksburg
2nd Vermont Infantry

Notes

References

External links

1833 births
1914 deaths
People from Waterford, Maine
Burials in Vermont
Union Army soldiers
United States Army Medal of Honor recipients
American Civil War recipients of the Medal of Honor